Kirk Rimer is a managing director of Crow Holdings Capital Investment Partners where he is responsible for the oversight and asset allocation process for their non-real estate assets.

Career
Prior to joining Crow Holdings Capital - Investment Partners in January 2011,  Rimer was a Managing Director at Goldman Sachs and the Southwest Regional Manager for the Private Wealth Management Division. He worked for Goldman Sachs for 20 years (from 1990-2010), focusing on risk management and equity investments, and was promoted to Managing Director of Goldman Sachs in October 2002.

Navy service

Mr. Rimer was a naval aviator for nine years with the United States Navy from 1979-1988.  He received his designation as a United States Naval Aviator and received his US Navy Wings in 1982 after graduating top of his flight school class. In January 1986, he received a United States Navy Achievement medal for participating in the NASA Challenger Shuttle Disaster recovery.

Community service
In 1993, Mr. Rimer founded the non-profit Time for Dallas, a young professional volunteer organization. In 1994, he received the Future Leader of Dallas award from the Dallas Junior Chamber of Commerce. Currently, Mr. Rimer is a trustee of Austin College in Sherman, Texas.  He is the Chairman of the Don Jackson Center for Financial Studies at Southern Methodist University and he sits on the Executive Board for SMU's Cox School of Business. He is also a Director for the Baylor Health Care System Foundation.  He is a Director on the Advisory Board for Shatterproof. Most recently, in February 2016, Mr. Rimer joined the Board of Directors for Goodwill Industries of Dallas, Inc.

Education
In 1977, Mr. Rimer was a United States Naval ROTC Scholarship Recipient to the University of Missouri. He graduated from the University of Missouri with a B.A. in Political Science. He earned his M.B.A. from Southern Methodist University's Cox School of Business in 1989.

Personal life
Mr. Rimer has been married to Jane Meredith Lewis since 1982.

References

United States Naval Aviators
Southern Methodist University alumni
Living people
Place of birth missing (living people)
Year of birth missing (living people)